The Network of Spiritual Progressives (NSP) is an international political and social justice movement based in the United States that seeks to influence American politics towards more humane, progressive values. The organization also challenges what it perceives as the misuse of religion by political conservatives and the anti-religious attitudes of many liberals. In the international sphere, the NSP seeks to foster inter-religious understanding and work for social justice.

The NSP was founded in 2005 by Rabbi Michael Lerner, who serves as co-director of the organization with Cornel West and Sister Joan Chittister. More than 1,200 activists attended each of the group's conferences in Berkeley, California (July 2005) and Washington, D.C. (May 2006).

As of December 2007, the NSP had chapters in 31 states as well as Toronto, Ontario, Canada; Melbourne, Australia; and in Costa Rica.

Basic tenets
The Network of Spiritual Progressives was founded based on three basic tenets:

 Changing the bottom line in America.
 Challenging the misuse of religion, God and spirit by the Religious Right.
 Challenging the many anti-religious and anti-spiritual assumptions and behaviors that have increasingly become part of the liberal culture.

See also
 Interreligious organisation
 Engaged Spirituality

References

Further reading
 Michael Lerner, The Left Hand of God: Taking Back Our Country from the Religious Right (New York: HarperCollins, 2006). .
 Jim Wallis, God's Politics: Why the Right Gets It Wrong and the Left Doesn't Get It (New York: HarperCollins, 2005). .

External links
 Network of Spiritual Progressives
 The Tikkun Community, parent organization of the Network of Spiritual Progressives

Religion and politics
Progressive organizations in the United States
Spiritual organizations
Organizations established in 2005
Liberalism and religion
2005 establishments in the United States